The helmeted pygmy tyrant (Lophotriccus galeatus) is a species of bird in the family Tyrannidae.
It is found in Brazil, Colombia, French Guiana, Guyana, Peru, Suriname, and Venezuela.
Its natural habitats are subtropical or tropical moist lowland forests and heavily degraded former forest.

Taxonomy
The helmeted pygmy tyrant was described by the French polymath Georges-Louis Leclerc, Comte de Buffon in 1780 in his Histoire Naturelle des Oiseaux from a sample collected in Cayenne, French Guiana. The bird was also illustrated in a hand-coloured plate engraved by François-Nicolas Martinet in the Planches Enluminées D'Histoire Naturelle which was produced under the supervision of Edme-Louis Daubenton to accompany Buffon's text.  Neither the plate caption nor Buffon's description included a scientific name but in 1783 the Dutch naturalist Pieter Boddaert coined the binomial name Montacilla galeata in his catalogue of the Planches Enluminées. The helmeted pygmy tyrant is now placed in the genus Lophotriccus that was introduced by the German ornithologist Hans von Berlepsch in 1883. The species is monotypic. The genus name combines the Ancient Greek lophos meaning "crest" with trikkos which is an unidentified small bird. In ornithology triccus is used to denote a tyrant flycatcher. The specific name galeatus is Latin for "helmeted".

References

External links
Xeno-canto: audio recordings of the helmeted pygmy tyrant

helmeted pygmy tyrant
Birds of Colombia
Birds of Venezuela
Birds of the Guianas
Birds of the Amazon Basin
helmeted pygmy tyrant
Birds of Brazil
Taxonomy articles created by Polbot